Roope Talaja (born August 2, 1988) is a Finnish professional ice hockey forward. He currently plays for Porin Ässät in the Finnish Liiga.

Talaja has played as a junior for the Blues, before making his professional debut in the Mestis with Kiekko-Vantaa. After making his debut on loan to HIFK in the 2009–10 season, he returned to the Blues to play in his first full SM-liiga season.

On May 3, 2012, Talaja agree to a two-year contract with HIFK.  After an unproductive second season with HIFK in 2013–14, in which he totaled just two goals in 31 games, Talaja made a third return to the Espoo Blues in agreeing to a two-year contract on April 4, 2014.

Career statistics

References

External links

1988 births
Living people
Espoo Blues players
HIFK (ice hockey) players
Kiekko-Vantaa players
Mikkelin Jukurit players
Finnish ice hockey left wingers
People from Kuopio
Sportspeople from North Savo